Balachandrudu is a 1990 Indian Telugu-language action drama film, produced and directed by Krishna under his Padmalaya Studios banner. It stars Mahesh Babu in the title role, Satyanarayana, Geetha, Sarath Kumar, Rami Reddy in other important roles and music composed by Raj–Koti.

Cast

Mahesh Babu as Balachandra
Satyanarayana
Geetha as Sujatha 
Sarath Kumar as Minor Babu
Rami Reddy as Sarangadhara Rao 
Prabhakar Reddy as Sripaada Rao
Chandra Mohan 
Ahuti Prasad as Poorna 
Raja as Sridhar
Babu Mohan
Ananth as Constable 
Eeswar Rao as Shanmukam
Latha Sri as Madhuri
Disco Shanti as item number
Tatineni Rajeswari as Saroja 
Jhansi
Ayesha Jaleel as Poorna's wife

Soundtrack

Music composed by Raj–Koti. Music released on Cauvery Audio Company.

References

Indian action drama films
Films scored by Raj–Koti
1990s action drama films
1990s Telugu-language films